Lee Sang-ki (Hangul: 이상기; born 5 June 1966) is a South Korean male épée fencer.

Lee is a four-time Olympian (1988, 1992, 1996, 2000) and bronze medalist at the 1994 World Fencing Championships in Athens, Greece. At the 2000 Olympics in Sydney, he won the bronze medal in the individual épée, defeating 2004 Olympic champion Marcel Fischer of Switzerland in the bronze medal match.

References

External links

1966 births
Living people
South Korean male épée fencers
Fencers at the 1988 Summer Olympics
Fencers at the 1992 Summer Olympics
Fencers at the 1996 Summer Olympics
Fencers at the 2000 Summer Olympics
Olympic fencers of South Korea
Olympic bronze medalists for South Korea
Olympic medalists in fencing
Medalists at the 2000 Summer Olympics
Asian Games medalists in fencing
Fencers at the 1986 Asian Games
Fencers at the 1990 Asian Games
Fencers at the 1994 Asian Games
Fencers at the 1998 Asian Games
Asian Games gold medalists for South Korea
Asian Games silver medalists for South Korea
Asian Games bronze medalists for South Korea
Medalists at the 1986 Asian Games
Medalists at the 1990 Asian Games
Medalists at the 1994 Asian Games
Medalists at the 1998 Asian Games